Crookall is a surname. Notable people with the surname include:

Arthur Crookall (1873–1935), Manx politician and philanthropist
Tim Crookall, Manx politician

See also
A.B. Crookall Trophy

Surnames of Manx origin